The Old School of Capitalism is a 2009 feature film directed by Serbian director Želimir Žilnik.

Plot
The film is mixture of documentary and fiction examining the new god of capitalism offered to the Serbs with the ending of state socialism. The story's background are a number of strikes in Belgrade during the late 2000s and these introduce us to a number of characters who play themselves.  Explosive situations result with employees dressed in American football helmets and pads square up with employers' heavies in their bullet-proof vests.

A visit from the Russian tycoon's representative and vice president Joe Biden's arrival complicate the proceedings further.

Reception
The Rotterdam Film Festival's review argues that it is an "intriguing docu-drama observes with x-ray eyes and in a sharp tone what's going on in the new Serbia. No lazy ideological analysis, but a complex and yet lighthearted portrait of the consequences of globalised capitalism for a country that has only just joined in the game."

See also
 Želimir Žilnik

References

External links
 

2009 films
Serbian-language films
Films directed by Želimir Žilnik
Serbian drama films
Films set in Belgrade